Jean-Pierre Abossolo-Ze (born 18 December 1956) is a Cameroonian former sprinter. He competed in the men's 4 × 400 metres relay at the 1984 Summer Olympics.

References

External links
 

1956 births
Living people
Athletes (track and field) at the 1984 Summer Olympics
Cameroonian male sprinters
Cameroonian male hurdlers
Olympic athletes of Cameroon
Place of birth missing (living people)